Out of the Past (billed in the United Kingdom as Build My Gallows High) is a 1947 film noir directed by Jacques Tourneur and starring Robert Mitchum, Jane Greer, and Kirk Douglas. The film was adapted by Daniel Mainwaring (using the pseudonym Geoffrey Homes) from his 1946 novel Build My Gallows High (also written as Homes), with uncredited revisions by Frank Fenton and James M. Cain.

Its complex, fatalistic storyline, dark cinematography, and classic femme fatale garnered the film critical acclaim and cult status. In 1991, the National Film Preservation Board at the Library of Congress added Out of the Past to the United States National Film Registry of “culturally, historically, or aesthetically significant” films.

Plot
Joe Stefanos arrives in Bridgeport, California, a rural mountain town, seeking Jeff Bailey, who owns a local gas station. Bailey is fishing with Ann Miller. They are in love. (Her lifelong friend Jim is jealous.) The Kid, Jeff's deaf-mute employee and friend, interrupts them, signing to Jeff. At the station, Stefanos tells Jeff that he must go to Lake Tahoe to meet "Whit." Jeff invites Ann to ride with him. He tells her about his past in a flashback.

Bailey's real last name is Markham. He and Jack Fisher were partners, private investigators in New York. Whit Sterling, a gambling kingpin, hires Markham—solo—to find Whit's girlfriend, Kathie Moffat, who shot him and stole $40,000. Whit promises she will not be harmed.

Jeff eventually corners Kathie in Acapulco. She seduces him. She admits that she shot Whit, but denies taking his money. Eventually, Jeff proposes that they run away together. Whit and Stefanos arrive. Jeff says that Kathie is on a south-bound steamer. Whit instructs Jeff to keep looking for her.

The couple goes to San Francisco. Fisher, now working for Whit, spots Jeff at the track. Jeff arranges to meet Kathie at a mountain cabin, but Fisher follows Kathie and tries to blackmail them. The two men brawl. Kathie deliberately kills Fisher and drives away, leaving behind a bank book showing a balance of $40,000.

The flashback ends. Jeff wants to clean things up and return to Ann. Ann leaves him at Whit's estate. A cheerful Whit tells Jeff he has a job for him. Jeff is startled when Kathie appears at breakfast. She comes to his room; he tells her to get out.

Leonard Eels, a crooked San Francisco lawyer, helped Whit dodge $1 million in taxes and is blackmailing him. Whit wants Jeff to recover the incriminating records. Eels' secretary, Meta Carson, explains the plan to Jeff, who suspects he is being framed. That night, at Eels' apartment, Jeff alerts Eels, obliquely, promising to return. After they leave, Jeff trails Meta, then returns and finds Eels dead. He hides the body.

In Meta's apartment, Jeff overhears Kathie arranging for the discovery of Eels' body. When the hidden body is not found, she believes Eels has escaped. Jeff confronts her and Kathie reveals that she gave Whit a signed affidavit swearing that Jeff killed Fisher. She says they can start all over again. They kiss, he leaves. Stefanos arrives and confirms that he killed Eels.

Jeff consigns the tax papers to a delivery service. Whit's thugs capture him. He offers the incriminating records in exchange for the affidavit, without implicating Kathie. When Kathie and Meta arrive at Eels' apartment to retrieve the affidavit, the police are already there. They instead phone Whit.

Jeff becomes wanted for the murders of Fisher and Eels and police expect him to return to Bridgeport. Stefanos, directed by Kathie, trails the Kid to the gorge where Jeff is hiding out. The Kid spots Stefanos poised to shoot Jeff and hooks his coat with a fishing line, pulling him off-balance so he falls to his death. Jeff returns to Whit's mansion to inform them of Stefanos death and to tell Whit about Kathie's doublecross. He suggests making Stefanos' death look like a guilt-ridden suicide after his murder of Eels. He will return the records if Whit destroys Kathie's affidavit and hands her over to the police for Fisher's death. Whit accepts, promising Kathie he will kill her if she does not cooperate.

Jeff meets Ann in the woods. She believes in him, but tells him to be absolutely sure of what he wants. She will wait.

Jeff discovers that Kathie has killed Whit. She gives him a choice: run away with her or take the blame for all three murders. He dials the phone while she is upstairs. They leave in a car with Jeff driving. Seeing a police roadblock ahead, Kathie shoots him. She fires at the police. A machine gun riddles the car with bullets, killing her.

In Bridgeport, Ann asks the Kid if Jeff was going away with Kathie. Lying, the Kid nods his head. Ann gets into Jim's car, and the Kid smiles, saluting Jeff's name on the gas station's sign.

Cast
 Robert Mitchum as Jeff Bailey, previously known as Jeff Markham
 Jane Greer as Kathie Moffat
 Kirk Douglas as Whit Sterling
 Rhonda Fleming as Meta Carson
 Richard Webb as Jim
 Steve Brodie as Jack Fisher
 Virginia Huston as Ann Miller
 Paul Valentine as Joe Stefanos
 Dickie Moore as The Kid
 Ken Niles as Leonard Eels
 Theresa Harris as Eunice Leonard

Background and production
Out of the Past was produced by RKO Pictures, and the key personnel—director Jacques Tourneur, cinematographer Nicholas Musuraca, actors Mitchum and Greer, along with Albert S. D'Agostino's design group—were long-time RKO collaborators. Although the studio focused on making B-films during the early 1940s, the post-World War-II Out of the Past was given a comparatively lavish budget.

John Garfield and Dick Powell turned down the lead. Kirk Douglas, in only his third credited screen performance, plays a supporting role but a central part in the story as Mitchum's antagonist. The next time Mitchum and Douglas played major roles in the same picture was in the 1967 Western The Way West, alongside Richard Widmark.

Musuraca also shot Tourneur's 1942 RKO horror film Cat People.

Reception
The film made a profit of $90,000.

Out of the Past is considered one of the greatest of all films noir.  Robert Ottoson hailed the film as "the ne plus ultra of forties film noir". Bosley Crowther, the film critic for The New York Times in 1947, complimented the crime drama's direction and performances, although he did find the latter portion of the screenplay hard to follow:

Shortly after the film's release, the staff of the widely read trade publication Variety also gave it a positive review:

Decades later, in his 2004 assessment of the film for the Chicago Sun-Times, critic Roger Ebert noted:With regard to the production's stylish and moody cinematography, Ebert also dubbed the film "The greatest cigarette-smoking movie of all time":

The film holds a score of 93% on review aggregation website Rotten Tomatoes, with an average rating of 9/10, based on 40 reviews.

Adaptations
Out of the Past was remade as Against All Odds (1984) with Rachel Ward in the Greer role, Jeff Bridges filling in for Mitchum, and James Woods as a variation of Kirk Douglas' villain, with Jane Greer as the mother of her original character in Out of the Past and Richard Widmark in a supporting role.

References

 Bibliography

 
 Out of the Past by Daniel Eagan in America's Film Legacy: The Authoritative Guide to the Landmark Movies in the National Film Registry, A&C Black, 2010 , pages 406-408

External links

 
 
 Out of the Past at Filmsite.org
 San Francisco in Cinema: Out of the Past
 
 Out of the Past at Moderntimes.com (archived)
 
 Out of the Past by Stephanie Zacharek at National Film Registry

1947 films
1947 crime drama films
American crime drama films
American Sign Language films
American black-and-white films
1940s English-language films
American detective films
Film noir
Films based on American novels
Films set in Acapulco
Films set in Los Angeles
Films set in New York City
Films set in San Francisco
Films set in the San Francisco Bay Area
Films shot in Mexico
RKO Pictures films
Films directed by Jacques Tourneur
Films scored by Roy Webb
United States National Film Registry films
1940s American films